MOUSE, short for MOdel for Urban SEwers, is a computer program that models collection system for urban wastewater and stormwater. MOUSE is the first micro-computer based software created by DHI and it was developed in 1983. The MOUSE engine is used in the CS - Pipeflow module of the hydraulic modeling software MIKE URBAN.

Applications
MOUSE can be used for analysing CSOs and SSOs, evaluating RDII, network capacity and bottlenecks, predicting local flooding, estimating sediment build-up and transport, optimization and design of RTC solutions, analysing water quality and sediment problems, and real-time modeling embedded in RTC solutions.

References

External links 
 DHI Water.Environment.Health

Hydrology models